I'm Glad My Mom Died is a memoir by American writer, director and former actress Jennette McCurdy based on her one-woman show of the same name. The book is about her career as a child actress and her difficult relationship with her abusive mother who died in 2013. It is McCurdy's first book and was published on August 9, 2022, by Simon & Schuster.

Background
McCurdy was a professional actress from age six until she announced that she had permanently stopped acting in 2017. From 2009 to 2012, she was signed to Capitol Records Nashville, who released her self-titled debut studio album in 2012.

McCurdy had previously written pieces in publications such as The Wall Street Journal and began writing personal essays shortly after. She sent some of the essays to her manager at the time, who encouraged her to write a book about her experiences. Rather than write a book, McCurdy created a one-woman show titled I'm Glad My Mom Died which she performed in Los Angeles and New York City. Plans to tour the show in other cities were canceled due to the COVID-19 pandemic, and she decided to write her material into a memoir.

Book cover 
The cover features McCurdy looking up and holding a pink urn with decorative paper spilling out. About the decision to use the photo for the book cover, McCurdy told the Entertainment Weekly:

Synopsis
In the memoir, McCurdy discusses her childhood as a successful child actress (including a strained relationship with a producer described only as "The Creator"), her brief foray into a country music career and the troubled and controlling relationship she had with her mother, Debra, who died from cancer in 2013. 

The book is divided into two sections, "Before" and "After", which describe the events of her life before and after the death of her mother.

Reception
The book sold out within 24 hours of going on sale at retailers including Amazon, Target, and Barnes & Noble. That same month it became a number one New York Times Best Seller for non-fiction in both hardcover and E-book, selling over 200,000 copies across all formats in its first week of release.

I'm Glad My Mom Died was met with "rave" reviews from critics, with review aggregator Book Marks reporting that none of the nine reviews were negative or mixed. In a starred review, Publishers Weekly called the book "Insightful and incisive, heartbreaking and raw."  Kirkus Reviews, which also gave a starred review, wrote that the book is, "The heartbreaking story of an emotionally battered child delivered with captivating candor and grace." Dave Itzkoff of The New York Times wrote that the memoir was, "A coming-of-age story that is alternately harrowing and mordantly funny."

Release history

See also
 Mommie Dearest

References

2022 non-fiction books
American memoirs
Books about death
Comedy books
Debut books
Show business memoirs
Simon & Schuster books